The Apostolic Vicariate of Northern Patagonia was a short-lived (1884-1904) pre-diocesan Latin Rite Catholic jurisdiction in Patagonia, southern Argentina.

History 
 Established in 1884 as Apostolic Vicariate of Northern Patagonia / Patagoniæ Septentrionalis (Latin) / Patagonia Settentrionale (Curiate Italian) / Patagoniæ Septentrionalis (Latin adjective), on territory split off from the Metropolitan Archdiocese of Buenos Aires
 Suppressed in 1904, it was merged back into the Metropolitan Archdiocese of Buenos Aires.

No statistics available.

Episcopal Ordinary 
Its only incumbent Apostolic Vicar of Northern Patagonia was :
 Giovanni Cagliero, Salesians (S.D.B.) (1884.09.30 – 1904.03.24), Titular Bishop of Magyddus (1884.10.30 – 1904.03.24); later papal diplomat : Titular Archbishop of Sebastea (1904.03.24 – 1915.12.06) as Apostolic Delegate to Costa Rica, Nicaragua and Honduras (1908.08.07 – retired 1915.12.06), created Cardinal-Priest of S. Bernardo alle Terme (1915.12.09 – 1920.12.16), promoted Cardinal-Bishop of Frascati (1920.12.16 – death 1926.02.28).

See also 
 List of Catholic dioceses in Argentina
 Apostolic Prefecture of Southern Patagonia

Sources and external links 
 GCatholic - data for all sections

Apostolic vicariates
Former Roman Catholic dioceses in America